Hobart James Chapel (August 6, 1896 – June 22, 1954)  was an American football guard who played one season for the Chicago Cardinals of the American Professional Football Association. He played under the name of "Leo Chappell".

References

1896 births
1954 deaths
People from Jackson County, Michigan
Players of American football from Michigan
American football guards
Chicago Cardinals players